Hope Elizabeth "Liza" Soberano(born January 4, 1998), is a Filipino-American actress, model and singer. She started in a range of television series and films, including Wansapanataym (2011), Kung Ako'y Iiwan Mo (2012), She's the One (2013), Must Be... Love (2013).  She rose to prominence after playing the protagonist in the romantic comedy television series Forevermore (2014–2015) with Enrique Gil. She has since paired with Gil in the films Just The Way You Are (2015), Everyday I Love You (2015), My Ex and Whys (2017), Alone/Together (2019) and the television series Forevermore (2014) Dolce Amore (2016) Bagani (2018) and Make It with You (2020).

Early life
Liza Soberano was born as Hope Elizabeth Soberano on January 4, 1998, in Santa Clara, California. She is the daughter of a Filipino father, John Castillo Soberano of Asingan, Pangasinan, and an American mother, Jacqulyn Elizabeth Hanley, who raised her in Santa Clara, California. She was raised in Visalia, California, by her paternal grandparents when her parents separated. When she was ten years old she moved to Manila, Philippines to live with her father and relatives.

Career

2011–2014: Beginnings
She was offered modeling work for print ads at the age of 12 after moving to Manila. When she was 13, she was discovered by a talent scout and introduced to Ogie Diaz, her new talent manager. Her talent manager urged her to learn Filipino so she could land successful television and film projects because she couldn't speak the language at the time.

Soberano made her acting debut in the anthology series Wansapanataym (2011). She then had a minor role as Claire Raymundo in Kung Ako'y Iiwan Mo (2012). Soberano then played the role of Angel in Daniel Padilla and Kathryn Bernardo's premier movie Must Be... Love. In 2013 she also starred as Gillian in She's the One with Bea Alonzo, Dingdong Dantes and Enrique Gil. A year later in 2014, she joined the primetime television series Got to Believe as Padilla's other love interest.

2014–2015: Breakthrough with Forevermore
In the successful romantic comedy television series Forevermore (2014), Soberano made her debut as the strawberry farmer Maria Agnes Calay with Enrique Gil, who played Alexander "Xander" Grande III, a hotel business heir who gradually becomes Agnes' love interest. The series finale earned a 39.3 percent rating. The success of the TV series made Soberano and Gil gain popularity.

Following the success of Forevermore, Soberano starred in the film based on the Wattpad book The Bet. The film adaptation, initially titled as the same name as its source material was renamed Just The Way You Are (2015).

In October 2015, Soberano and Gil then starred in a romantic drama film with Gerald Anderson, Everyday, I Love You, directed by Mae Czarina Cruz-Alviar.

2016–present: Continued success, loveteam separation and expansion to Hollywood
In February 2016, Soberano starred in the romantic comedy melodrama series Dolce Amore. She portrays Serena Marchesa, a young girl raised in Italy by her adoptive parents. Though she lives a good life, she cannot shake off the feeling that an important part of her identity seems to be missing. In August 2016, it was announced that Soberano had signed as the new face of Maybelline.

In 2017, Soberano starred in the romantic comedy drama film My Ex and Whys opposite Enrique Gil. The film was directed by Cathy Garcia Molina, who had previously worked with her in Forevermore. The film was released in February 2017, grossing ₱31.5 million on its first day and won her the GMMSF Box-Office Entertainment Award for Box Office Entertainment Award for Box Office Queen.

In May 2017, Soberano confirmed that she would star as the comics superheroine Darna in planned film adaptation, which was set to be released in 2019. However, due to an injury she suffered during primetime drama Bagani, she chose to withdraw from the role on April 4, 2019. The new adaptation was later reworked as a television series.

The following cancellation of Make It with You due to the COVID-19 pandemic in the Philippines and its network's franchise renewal issues marked the end of the loveteam pairing with Gil. ABS-CBN Films head Kriz Gazmen stated that although they pitched several projects to the duo and was about to "shoot something" (that was later scrapped following COVID case surges in the country at that time), "the timing was never right," and "Liza made the decision to change [her] career direction.”

In 2022, Soberano signed with Careless Music, an American-Filipino based talent agency and record label founded by her contemporary James Reid in partnership with Far East Movement's Transparent Arts label. With this new career trajectory, she relocated back to the United States and has plans to forge a career in Hollywood, starting with Lisa Frankenstein for Focus Features.

Public image
In August 2015, she was included in The Philippine Star Lifestyle "29 Most Bright & Beautiful" list. Campaign Asia Magazine named Soberano as 2017 most popular endorser of the year.

In December 2017, Liza Soberano was ranked first of "The 100 Most Beautiful Faces of 2017" by TC Candler's The Independent Critics, a group which has been publishing the list since 1990.

In 2018, YouGov an international Internet-based market research and data analytics firm in United Kingdom, listed Soberano as the No.1 most admired woman in the Philippines.

Soberano is often described in the media as "one of Philippine television's most beautiful faces", she stated "I appreciate it but sometimes that's all they notice and i don't want them to remember me because I'm pretty." As for her, she wants to be recognized for her confidence and courage to take new roles in her career.

Soberano has been praised by Filipino critics for her acting prowess. Soberano's performance in the film Everyday, I Love You received positive reviews from critics; Peter P. Asilo of the Philippine Daily Inquirer said: "Soberano's acting choices may need more texture and refinement—but, at only 17, lovely Liza is quickly coming into her own as a fine actress!" Columnist Mario Bautista said: "We'll have no reservations in declaring her the prettiest, most refreshing, most captivating young actress.Beautiful from any angle, she also acts competently, doing both her madcap as well as her dramatic scenes quite convincingly. The camera just loves her and she doesn't make any false move, whether she's clowning around or getting to be so emotional ... She has an endearing screen presence and palpable charisma." while Abby Mendoza of Pep.ph, regarding her performance, said: "it is Liza Soberano who particularly stands out—which isn't to harp on her beautiful face on screen. She is a natural who displays the right restraint, pleasing to watch all the more since she doesn't try too hard."

Advocacy and issues 
Soberano often uses her influence in Philippine media to promote subjects she cares about, such as mental health awareness, and the need for the government to address the 2020 COVID-19 crisis with "empathy not threats." But she generally avoided being vocal about her opinions and advocacies, because she used to be afraid it would be divisive.  She later remarked:"I was always afraid that I would be dividing my supporters. I was afraid of creating conflict[...] Ang paniniwala ko po dati na pag artista ka, dapat umiiwas ka sa lahat ng issues. (I used to think that if you were an actress, you should avoid all issues.) [...]We just keep talking about our craft, and the next movie we’re making and everything. Kasi, I was afraid that people would judge me. They would say, what do I know, I'm just a girl, I'm just an actress.”

Speaking up against rape jokes 

In September 2020, Soberano became the subject of various online "rape comments" as part of public reaction to an incident where her internet service provider supposedly prioritized her connection repairs because of elitism due to her expressing disappointment with the service. Noting that there was no excuse for such online harassment, Soberano decided to lodge a formal case against one of the commenters, saying "“I was really upset because the fact that it is a rape joke, it is not something that should be taken lightly," and "I know that everybody is entitled to their own opinion, that is true, but at some point you have to be respectful to others online. I want people to learn that there are consequences to everything, like rape jokes, because that is not a light matter."

In October 2020, Soberano spoke at an online event organized by Gabriela Youth, the youth arm of the women's rights group Gabriela.  In her speech, she noted how the rape comment incident made her realize "the importance of standing up for [her]self", saying: "As a woman, as a Filipino artist, I think that women and influencers alike should start speaking up. They can contribute not only awareness about these issues, but also encouragement and confidence to our fellow women and children — that they need to learn to stand up for themselves."

Red-tagging incident 

Soon after speaking at an Gabriela Youth event, Soberano became the subject of an alleged red-tagging incident. AFP Southern Luzon Command commander Lt. Gen. Antonio Parlade Jr. said that Soberano and 2018 Miss Universe Catriona Gray should not support Gabriela and other rights groups, as fellow celebrity Angel Locsin has done.

Parlade specifically said: "Liza Soberano, there's still a chance to abdicate that group. If you don't, you will suffer the same fate as Josephine Anne Lapira." Lapira, a 22-year-old student activist from the University of the Philippines Manila, had been killed in November 2017 in a clash between army troops and alleged suspected members of Marxist–Leninist–Maoist New People's Army.  Parlade clarified, however: "Is she an NPA? No, of course not. Not yet."

In response, Soberano's legal counsel Juanito Lim Jr. said that the actress is not afraid of the statement of General Parlade and that Liza "will continue to exercise her constitutionally-protected right to free speech and expression without fear or restraint from anyone."

Philippine Senator Risa Hontiveros also chided Parlade, saying: Don't use your position as a general to scare and threaten these women. Your threats and harassment are unacceptable. By silencing them, you are tolerating the violence, rape, and abuse being experienced by many Filipinos.

Personal life
In February 2019, Soberano and Enrique Gil publicly confirmed they had been a couple since October 24, 2014.

Soberano is a Roman Catholic. She and her brother, Justin David, received the sacraments of initiation. She is a dual citizen of the United States and the Philippines.

Filmography

Film

Television

Music video appearances

Awards and nominations

Notes

References

External links

 
 

1998 births
Living people
ABS-CBN personalities
Actresses from Metro Manila
Actresses from the San Francisco Bay Area
American actresses of Filipino descent
American people of Ilocano descent
Catholics from California
Citizens of the Philippines through descent
Filipino child actresses
Filipino film actresses
Filipino Roman Catholics
Filipino television actresses
Filipino voice actresses
People from Santa Clara, California
People from Quezon City
Star Magic